Dedy Jaya Siregar (born on October 8, 1992) is an Indonesian footballer that currently plays for Persiwa Wamena in the Indonesia Super League.

References

External links
Dedy Jaya Siregar at Liga Indonesia

1992 births
Living people
People from Wamena
Indonesian footballers
Liga 1 (Indonesia) players
Persiwa Wamena players
Indonesian Premier Division players
Association football goalkeepers
Sportspeople from Papua